Stray Cats are an American rockabilly band formed in 1979.

Stray Cats may also refer to:

 Stray Cats (album), 1981 by Stray Cats
 Stray Cats (film), a 2009 South Korean film
 Stray Cats, disc one of So Much Shouting, So Much Laughter by Ani DiFranco, 2002
 Stray Cats, a collection of singles and non-album tracks from The Rolling Stones in Mono, 2016

See also
 
 Stray (disambiguation)
 Cat (disambiguation)
 Cats (disambiguation)
 Estray, in law, any domestic animal found wandering at large or lost
 Feral cat
 The Stray Cat, a 2014 Mexican telenovela